"The Big Picture" is a song by American synth-pop band Y Kant Tori Read, commercially released by Atlantic Records in 1988 exclusively as a 7" vinyl single in a generic picture sleeve. Two versions of a promotional 7" vinyl were also released, one with light blue labels and one with dark blue labels. A 12" promotional vinyl single was also issued with an accompanying picture sleeve. The song was a commercial failure and received absolutely no critical comment.

A music video for "The Big Picture" was shot by Marty Callner. The only band member to appear in it is Tori Amos. It is typical of the era, featuring a scantily clad Amos cavorting and wreaking havoc on a sound-stage made to resemble the back alleys of Los Angeles. It is notable for a narrative introductory bit during which Amos argues with a police officer about her illegally parked car.  Amos' excuse is that someone broke into her car and stole her underwear: "That's gross!"  The officer, undeterred, hands her the ticket and walks off with her garter belt hanging out of his back pocket.

Notably, graphic artist Rantz Hoseley, a friend of Amos' at the time, appears in the video as a street punk upon whose pants Amos spray-paints. Hoseley went on to edit the best selling Amos-themed comic anthology Comic Book Tattoo.

Track listing
7" Single (Atlantic 7-89086)
 "The Big Picture" – 4:19
"You Go to My Head" – 3:55

12" Promo Single (Atlantic PR2298)
 "The Big Picture" – 4:19
 "The Big Picture" – 4:19

External links
Official Tori Amos website
The Y Kant Tori Read FAQ

1988 debut singles
Y Kant Tori Read songs
Songs written by Tori Amos
Songs written by Kim Bullard
1988 songs
Atlantic Records singles
Music videos directed by Marty Callner